Drishti (from Sanskrit दृष्टि dr̥ṣţi, meaning "vision" or "insight") is a multi-platform, open-source volume-exploration and presentation tool.  Written for visualizing tomography data, electron-microscopy data and the like, it aims to ease understanding of data sets and to assist with conveying that understanding to the research community or to lay persons. From the website: "The central idea about Drishti is that the scientists should be able to use it for exploring volumetric datasets as well as use it in presentations."

The Commonwealth Scientific and Industrial Research Organisation  (CSIRO) in Australia has used Drishti for a number of purposes, such as volumetric visualisation of various computer-tomography datasets.  The Australian National University (ANU) Physics Department, along with the author of the software, has used it for (amongst other things) the analysis of immiscible flow in massive 3D systems.  Further uses were presented at the APAC '07.

Among other software, Drishti uses Qt for the GUI widgets and OpenGL Extension Wrangler Library (GLEW).

Features 

Drishti provides a number of features that would otherwise require several proprietary volume visualisation programs or that are simply not available together in other software:

 volume rendering: drawing a scalar function defined over a volumetric region of space with some translucent appearance so that the interior of the dataset can be observed.
 2D Transfer functions (or Lookup tables): In addition to, or instead of thresholding, Drishti allows the user to apply transfer functions across "density" or "value" as well as gradient.
 clipping: removing some spatial region from a dataset.
 Streamlines
 Masking
 Brick Animations
 Realtime animation and movie export with:
 camera choreography (camera position, pan, rotation, zoom, etc.)
 transfer-function choreography
 time series choreography
 sub-volume choreography
 Importing DICOM image stack in addition to the current raw and processed (netCDF) volume file formats.
 Tensor visualization using superellipsoids
 Network (Graph) visualization
 Remap facility for remapping 16/32 bit volumes to 8 bit volumes
 Cropping and scaling facility for image stacks
 Cropping and scaling facility for RAW volumes
 Saving movies from the program

References

External links 
 Drishti Website
 Drishti Tutorial Videos
 Download Drishti

Free data visualization software
Free DICOM software
Science software that uses Qt